The European Land Mammal Mega Zones (abbreviation: ELMMZ, more commonly known as European land mammal ages or ELMA) are zones in rock layers that have a specific assemblage of fossils (biozones) based on occurrences of fossil assemblages of European land mammals. These biozones cover most of the Cenozoic, with particular focus having been paid to the Neogene and Paleogene systems (i.e. rock layers which are 65.5 to 2.588 million years old), the Quaternary has several competing systems. In cases when fossils of mammals are abundant, stratigraphers and paleontologists can use these biozones as a more practical regional alternative to the stages of the official ICS geologic timescale. European Land Mammal Mega Zones are often also confusingly referred to as ages, stages, or intervals.

Biostratigraphic methods
Mammal zones were, like all biozones, established using geographic place names where fossil materials were obtained. The basic unit of measure is the first/last boundary statement. This shows that the first appearance event of one taxon is known to predate the last appearance event of another. If two taxa are found in the same fossil quarry or at the same stratigraphic horizon, then their age-range zones overlap.

The terrestrial stratigraphy of the Cenozoic is more difficult than that of marine deposits. The geologic timescale of the ICS is therefore based on marine fossils, that don't occur in terrestrial sediments. This makes the correlation of terrestrial deposits with the ICS timescale often difficult. Correlation is possible when marine deposits interfinger with terrestrial deposits (resulting from a series of transgressions and regressions of the sea during deposition), but this isn't the case everywhere. A fine stratigraphic division of the terrestrial record can in most places only be made using fossils of land species. Small mammals are often the best choice as they are quite abundant in the terrestrial record, especially their teeth. Teeth have an even better chance of preservation than bones.

The European mammalian biozones were established for the Paleogene (66-23.03 Mya, 8 zones) and Neogene (23.03-2.58 Mya, 7 zones) separately. Some of these, especially for the Neogene, were already established in the 19th century. The Villafranchian was, for example, introduced by Lorenzo Pareto in 1865. A finer subdivision was established by Pierre Mein in 1975, who divided the Neogene in 17 zones, known as the MN zonation, indicated by the letters MN (Mammal Neogene) and a number.

Similarly, a more detailed subdivision for the Paleogene period was established. There are 30 such Mammal Paleogene zones (MP1 to MP30, numbered from old to young).

Paleogene European mammal zones 

There are 30 Mammal Paleogene zones covering the Paleogene (66-23.03 Mya).

Neogene European mammal zones

European Land Mammal Mega Zones most often have their bases at first appearances (FAD, First Appearance Date) of a certain species or genus. The numbers are higher for younger zones. Due to a redefinition of the boundary between the Neogene and Quaternary periods, MN 17 is now in fact considered a Quaternary biozone.

Quaternary European mammal zones 
The first zonation for the Quaternary of Europe was proposed by Azzaroli in 1967. This was then expanded by Gliozzi et al. in 1997 to make a system of 3 'ages' subdivided into 13 'faunal units'. The scheme does not define boundaries but instead is accompanied by a range chart, where the entry and exit dates for the taxa are indicated. Each zone is named after a reference locality. Most of the reference locations are in Italy but the scheme is used in other European regions. The mammal ages and Faunal Units (FU) after Gliozzi et al. are:

In 1982, Guérin proposed an alternative scheme, which extended the MN zonation scheme for the Neogene with additional units to cover the Quaternary. There have been further updates since. The MNQ (Mammal Neogene Quaternary) scheme added an additional 12 units in total, MNQ 16–27.

For small mammals there is a third scheme, the MmQ, published by Agustí, Moyà‐Solà, and Pons‐Moyà in 1987. The scheme includes some large mammals for reference and thus has a wider application.

Other continental mammalian biozones
Asian land mammal age
Mammal Paleogene zone
North American land mammal age
South American land mammal age

References

Notes

Literature
Koufos, G.D.; Kostopoulos, D.S. & Vlachou, T.D. (2005). '"Neogene/Quaternary mammalian migrations in Eastern Mediterranean", Belgian Journal of Zoology 135(2): pp. 181–190. 

Mein, P. (1975). Report on activity RCMNS-Working groups, 1971–1975, pp. 78–81, Bratislava.

External links
 Stratigraphic charts at http://stratigraphy.science.purdue.edu

 
Regional geologic time scales
Biochronology
Cenozoic Europe

de:ELMMZ Neogen